The Via Rápida 2 or VR2 (Fast Road 2 in English) is the second motorway on the island of Madeira.
Construction started in 2008
In 2011, this construction had to stop due to lands owners and the financial crisis in Portugal
In 2015, the construction resumed with funding from the European Regional Development Fund and it was finally opened in 25 April 2017.

With 3,7  km it goes from Câmara de Lobos to Estreito de Câmara de Lobos, providing a fast connection between the downtown of Câmara de Lobos and the North of the same municipality, Jardim da Serra, Estreito de Câmara de Lobos and Covão.

Junctions

There are 4 Junctions and 3 tunnels in total.

References

Roads in Portugal
2017 establishments in Portugal
Transport in Madeira